A sustainable development reserve (RDS) in Brazil is a type of protected area inhabited by a traditional population that seeks to preserve nature while maintaining and improving the life of the population through sustainable development.

Background

The concept of Sustainable Development Reserves originated in the Projeto Mamirauá launched in the early 1990s by the Sociedade Civil Mamirauá.
The project followed the principle of management based on scientific research and controlled use of natural resources.
The local population participates actively in the planning process and in responsible for managing and monitoring the area.
Key aspects are that the strategy can adapt to changes in the market, private property is maintained, plans are implemented to improve living conditions, and the local people partner with government agencies and NGOs to develop proposals for sustainable use.

The Mamirauá Sustainable Development Reserve was established in 1996, the first such reserve in Brazil.
The adjacent Amanã Sustainable Development Reserve was established in 1998 after the successful implementation of the Mamirauá reserve, and was fully supported by the local people.
They already recognized the importance of preserving the vegetation and animals that they depend upon for their livelihood.
The new category of protected area was included in the National Protected Areas System (SNUG), which defined types of protected area of Brazil in 2000.

Structure

A Sustainable Development Reserve (RDS) holds traditional populations that live by sustainable exploitation of natural resources, developed over generations and adapted to the local ecology, and that protect nature and maintain biological diversity.
The goals are to preserve nature while preserving and improving the quality of life of the traditional populations, and to advance scientific knowledge and understanding of traditional techniques for managing the environment.

The land in an RDS is in the public domain, and may be expropriated.
Land use is regulated according to Law 9985 article 23 (2000) and in specific regulations.
A board of directors is chaired by the administrative agency and includes representatives of public bodies, civil society organizations and traditional populations living in the area.
A management plan is created by the administrative agency, which recognises the dynamic balance between conservation goals and the size of the population.
Natural ecosystems may be exploited sustainably, and cultivation of introduced species is allowed, subject to the management plan.
The plan defines areas where the ecology is fully protected, buffer zones, zones of sustainable use and ecological corridors.
Public visits to the RDS are allowed and encouraged where compatible with local interests and the management plan.
Scientific research and education with focus on conservation of nature are also encouraged.

Selected reserves

Notes

Sources

 
Indigenous politics in Brazil
Sustainability in Brazil
Sustainable communities
Sustainable development
Types of protected area of Brazil